Lukáš Cingel (born 10 June 1992) is a Slovak professional ice hockey forward currently playing for Mountfield HK in the Czech Extraliga (ELH).

He participated for Slovakia at the 2017 IIHF World Championship.

Career statistics

Regular season and playoffs

International

References

External links

1992 births
Living people
Slovak ice hockey forwards
Sportspeople from Žilina
Slovak expatriate ice hockey players in the Czech Republic
Baie-Comeau Drakkar players
HC Sparta Praha players
MsHK Žilina players
HC Lev Praha players
Stadion Hradec Králové players
Ice hockey players at the 2018 Winter Olympics
Olympic ice hockey players of Slovakia
Slovak expatriate ice hockey players in Canada